Akil Campbell (born 1 February 1996) is a Trinidadian road and track cyclist. His sister Teniel Campbell is also a professional cyclist.

Major results

Track

2015
 National Championships
1st  Scratch
1st  Points race
1st  Team pursuit
2017
 National Championships
1st  Omnium
1st  Points race
2018
 3rd  Omnium, Central American and Caribbean Games
2019
 National Championships
1st  Scratch
1st  Omnium
1st  Individual pursuit
2021
 1st Overall Elimination, UCI Nations Cup
1st Elimination, Cali
2022
 1st Elimination, Cali, UCI Nations Cup
 National Championships
1st  Scratch
1st  Points race
1st  Individual pursuit

Road
2014
 1st  Time trial, National Junior Championships
2015
 1st  Time trial, National Championships
2016
 National Championships
1st  Time trial
2nd Road race
2019
 National Championships
2nd Road race
2nd Time trial

References

External links

1996 births
Living people
Trinidad and Tobago male cyclists
People from San Fernando, Trinidad and Tobago
Cyclists at the 2019 Pan American Games
Central American and Caribbean Games medalists in cycling
Central American and Caribbean Games bronze medalists for Trinidad and Tobago
Competitors at the 2018 Central American and Caribbean Games